Sven Kaiser (born 27 August 1973) is a German former footballer. He was part of the Hertha BSC reserve team who reached the 1992–93 DFB-Pokal Final and made 19 appearances for Hertha's first team in the 2. Bundesliga.

References

External links

1973 births
Living people
German footballers
Association football midfielders
Association football forwards
Hertha BSC II players
Hertha BSC players
FC Sachsen Leipzig players
FC Carl Zeiss Jena players
SV Lichtenberg 47 players
2. Bundesliga players
East German footballers
People from East Berlin
Footballers from Berlin